Jimena Fama is an Argentine composer, multi-instrumentalist and producer based in New York and London. Her previous custom work can be found under Electro Dub Tango.

In popular culture
Her song La Bohemia have been featured in TV Show Dancing with the Stars (US), So You Think you Can Dance (Canada), Strictly Come Dancing (BBC London, Germany and Denmark) & her single Mundo Bizarro could be heard on BBC Radio 3.

Starbucks selected her song Mundo Bizarro for an album by Warner Music with the 12 best pieces of Tango placing her between Piazzolla and Yo Yo Ma. 

Her songs have been selected by labels in UK, Germany, Denmark, France, Portugal, Switzerland, New Zealand, US, Canada. The Brand GUESS included her song Pampas in a Girl's Fragrance commercial in Paris. WOW World of Wearable Art in New Zealand featured Mundo Bizarro for a Theatrical Extravaganza & Fashion Show with World Top Fashion Designers next to Queen and Cirque du Soleil.

Performances
Gala Honoring Robert De Niro, Samuel L. Jackson, Spike Lee at the Metropolitan Museum
Malbec World Day at Guggenheim Museum by Argentinean Consulate
Malbec World Day at Argentine Embassy in Washington DC
Larry Gagosian Art Basel
Faena Group Art Basel Gala
Consulate of Argentina in New York, Los Angeles and Miami
Santa Barbara Polo Club
Maserati Polo Cup
La Martina Polo Cup
Greenwich Polo East Coast Open

Placements
Dancing with the Stars featuring La Bohemia (United States)
So You Think You Can Dance featuring La Bohemia (Canada)
Strictly Come Dancing featuring Mundo Bizarro (Denmark)
Strictly Come Dancing featuring Mundo Bizarro (Germany)
World of Wearable Art featuring Mundo Bizarro (New Zealand)

Commercials
GUESS! featuring Pampas (France)

Discography

Albums
Electro Dub Tango (2005)
Electro Dub Tango Meets Bossa Nova (2007)
Electro Dub Tango Meets Europe (2009)
Electro Dub Tango Meets World Cup (2011)
Ecos De Buenos Aires (2015)

Compilations
BEGINNERS TANGO GUIDE featuring La Bohemia & La Rivera (2007)
JAZZMINE. THE FINEST WORLD BEATS BUENOS AIRES featuring Mundo Bizarro & Gira (2007)
BAR TANGO featuring Mundo Bizarro
NIKKI BEACH featuring La Bohemia
TANGO CLUB NIGHT 2 featuring La Bohemia & Malevo (2004)
JACK DANIEL’S. LAMC featuring Mundo Bizarro (dub version) (2005)
LIVING EMOTIONS III featuring Gira
RITZ CARLTON SOUTH BEACH featuring L’Amour
THE BALLROOM MIX 7 featuring La Conspiracion
CANDLE LOUNGE featuring Malevo (2014)
THE TANGO CLUB NIGHT Vol 3 featuring La Mision (2014)
TRAVEL TUNES. BUTLERS featuring La Rivera (2014)

References

External links
 Maktub Records

Living people
21st-century Argentine women singers
Argentine women singer-songwriters
Musicians from Buenos Aires
Tango
Year of birth missing (living people)